Kentucky Route 160, also known as KY 160, is a state highway in the U.S. state of Kentucky. It runs from the Virginia state line, where the roadway continues east to Appalachia, Virginia as State Route 160, north via Lynch, Benham, Clutts, Cumberland, Sand Hill, Gordon, Linefork, Kings Creek, Premium, and Hot Spot to Kentucky Route 15 at Van. KY 160 overlaps KY 15 through Isom to Cody, where it splits to run via Carr Creek, Brinkley, and Hindman, ending at Kentucky Route 1087 at Vest. Due to the mountainous terrain and numerous tight bends. KY 160 is signposted closed to tractor-trailers from Lynch to the Virginia state line. 

KY 160 is part of the State Primary System from Virginia to the U.S. Highway 119 interchange in Cumberland, the State Secondary System from US 119 to KY 15 at Van and from KY 15 at Cody to Kentucky Route 80 north of Hindman, and the Rural Secondary System from KY 80 to KY 1087 at Vest.

Major intersections

References

0160
0160
0160
0160